Polemannia is a genus of flowering plants belonging to the family Apiaceae.

It is native to South Africa (the Cape Provinces, the Free State and KwaZulu-Natal) and Lesotho.

The genus name of Polemannia is in honour of Peter Heinrich Polemann (1779 – 1839), a German chemist and apothecary who supported plant collectors in Schleswig-Holstein, who went to Cape Town, South Africa. It was first described and published in Enum. Pl. Afric. Austral. on page 347 in 1837.

Known species
According to Kew:
Polemannia grossulariifolia 
Polemannia montana 
Polemannia simplicior

References

Apioideae
Flora of Southern Africa
Apioideae genera